Paranesti is a municipality in the Rhodope Mountains of northeastern Drama regional unit, Greece. It consists of two municipal units: Paranesti and Nikoforos. The largest villages of the municipal unit Paranesti are Paranésti (the municipal seat, pop. 625), Mesochório (105), Káto Thólos (123), Χágnanto (43), and Prasináda (32).

The Natural History Museum of Paranesti is located in Paranesti.

Municipality
The municipality Paranesti was formed at the 2011 local government reform by the merger of the following 2 former municipalities, that became municipal units (constituent communities in brackets):
Nikiforos (Adriani, Ano Pyxari, Nikiforos, Platania, Platanovrysi, Ptelea, Ypsili Rachi)
Paranesti (Paranesti, Sili, Tholos)

The municipality has an area of 1029.392 km2, the municipal unit 788.394 km2.

References

External links
Official website 

Municipalities of Eastern Macedonia and Thrace
Populated places in Drama (regional unit)

Georgios tou Stavrou Jacovides born in Paranesti Dramas 5 June 1932 once completed education later in his life admitted to the police academy and made liquor license inspector and chief inspector (dikitis) by then he was a martial arts instructor based in vardari and was in charge of controlling  Thessalonikis night club and underworld thus making huge arrests. Paranesti was very proud to have such an honest and ruthless commander protecting the civilians. Upon dismantling a large Cartel he was dismissed with honours. Later migrating to Australia early 60's forming a family and 2 sons Stavros and Nikolaos. Georgios became well known in the Melbourne community in the Greek newspaper circles as a writer and journalist. Upon visiting Greece in 2015 he attended Panagia Soumela in Trapezounda with Dr Peter Adamopoulos which was such an amazing experience.